Thomas Kufen (born 5 August 1973, in Essen) is a German politician of the Christian Democratic Union (CDU).

Life 
Kufen was a member of the Landtag of North Rhine-Westphalia from 2000 to 2005 and again from 2012 until 21 October 2015. Between 2005 and 2010, he served as Commissioner for Integration in the state government of Minister-President Jürgen Rüttgers.

Since 2015 Kufen has been Lord mayor of German city Essen.

Kufen has also been part of the CDU leadership in North Rhine-Westphalia under party chairman Armin Laschet since 2014. Following the 2017 state elections in North Rhine-Westphalia, Kufen was part of Laschet's team in the negotiations with the Free Democrats (FDP) on a coalition agreement. He served in the working group on municipal policy.

On the national level, Kufen was a CDU delegate to the Federal Convention for the purpose of electing the President of Germany in 2004 and 2017.

Other activities (selection)

Corporate boards
 RWE, Member of the Supervisory Board (since 2021)
 Essen/Mülheim Airport, Ex-Officio Member of the Supervisory Board
 Essen Marketing GmbH (EMG), Ex-Officio Chairman of the Supervisory Board
 Essener Versorgungs- und Verkehrsgesellschaft, Ex-Officio Chairman of the Supervisory Board
 Messe Essen, Ex-Officio Chairman of the Supervisory Board
 RAG-Stiftung, Member of the Board of Trustees
 RWE Power AG, Ex-Officio Member of the Supervisory Board
 Sparkasse Essen, Ex-Officio Chairman of the Supervisory Board

Non-profits
 Center for Turkish Studies, University of Duisburg-Essen, Member of the Board of Trustees
 European Centre for Creative Economy (ECCE), Ex-Officio Member of the Board of Trustees
 Johannes-Rau-Forschungsgemeinschaft (JRF), Member of the Board of Trustees
 Johanniter-Unfall-Hilfe (JUH), Member of the Advisory Board
 Museum Folkwang, Ex-Officio Member of the Board of Trustees
 Zollverein Coal Mine Industrial Complex, Ex-Officio Member of the Board of Trustees

Political positions
Ahead of the Christian Democrats’ leadership election in 2021, Kufen publicly endorsed Armin Laschet to succeed Annegret Kramp-Karrenbauer as the party’s chair.

Personal life
Kufen is since 2015 married with fellow politician David Lüngen. In December 2017, he officiated the wedding of Jens Spahn and Daniel Funke at Borbeck Palace in Essen.

References

External links

 Website by Thomas Kufen

Christian Democratic Union of Germany politicians
Members of the Landtag of North Rhine-Westphalia
Gay politicians
LGBT conservatism
LGBT mayors of places in Germany
Mayors of Essen
1973 births
Living people